The Paulson House in Au Train, Michigan was built in 1883.  It was listed on the National Register of Historic Places and designated a state of Michigan Historic site in 1972.

History
The Paulson House was built in 1883 by Charles Paulson, a Swede who had worked as a miner in Ishpeming and Negaunee.  Paulson homesteaded the surrounding area, growing cabbages. He also owned a local gravel pit. The upper floor of the cabin was used as a school room in the early part of the 20th century.  Paulson and his wife lived in the cabin until their deaths in 1925.

One of Paulson's daughters continued to live in the house until her death in the 1930s.  The Russell family lived in the house from the mid-1940s to the mid-1950s.  The house was vacant for some time, until the 1970s when it was extensively rehabilitated both inside and out.

The house is now a museum.

Description
The Paulson House is a -story, side-gable, L-shaped house, constructed of cedar logs. The main section measures 25 feet by 29 feet; a single-story addition measures 12 feet by 18 feet.  The logs are V-notched, and the gables are covered with vertical siding.

References

External links
Official site

Houses on the National Register of Historic Places in Michigan
Houses in Alger County, Michigan
Houses completed in 1883
Michigan State Historic Sites
Museums in Alger County, Michigan
Historic house museums in Michigan
Swedish-American history
National Register of Historic Places in Alger County, Michigan